Volodymyr Volodymyrovych Lysenko (born 20 April 1988) is a Ukrainian professional football forward who plays for Kolos Kovalivka.

Career

Club career
Lysenko started to play football for FC CSKA Kyiv, later joined to Dynamo Kyiv, he was finally promoted to the main team in 2006, but he almost never able to play on a game. He was loaned to Arsenal Kyiv for the 2007–08 season and once again for the 2008–09 season. On 22 July 2009 FC Metalist Kharkiv buy his contract from Dynamo Kyiv for €1.5 million.

International career
He played for Ukraine's under-17 and under-19 teams. On 21 August 2007 he debuted for the Ukraine national under-21 football team in a what ended to be 1:1 at home draw with Israel. Since then, Lysenko has played 13 games and netted 3 goals.

References

External links
 
 
 Статистика текущего сезона (2008/09)
 Профиль на сайте ФФУ

Ukrainian footballers
Living people
Footballers from Kyiv
FC Dynamo Kyiv players
FC Dynamo-2 Kyiv players
FC Arsenal Kyiv players
FC Metalist Kharkiv players
FC Volyn Lutsk players
FC Kryvbas Kryvyi Rih players
FC Sevastopol players
FC Hoverla Uzhhorod players
FC Olimpik Donetsk players
FC Desna Chernihiv players
FC Kolos Kovalivka players
Ukrainian Premier League players
Ukrainian First League players
1988 births
Association football forwards
Ukraine youth international footballers
Ukraine under-21 international footballers